Bust-A-Move Pocket, also called Puzzle Bobble Mini, is a Neo Geo Pocket Color version of the Puzzle Bobble (Bust-A-Move) series of puzzle video games. It was released on the Neo Geo Pocket Color by Taito in 1999.

The format is similar to Puzzle Bobble 2 for the PlayStation. The game's Puzzle mode includes a feature that saves initials of those who have completed the level in the fastest time. The game contains a survivor mode where the player has to burst the oncoming bubbles, making sure they don't reach the bottom line which spells the end of the game. Also present is a vs CPU mode, where the player can compete against a selection of eight characters.

Reception

Jeff Gerstmann of GameSpot said the game has good rendered colorful graphics, catchy music and overall a good portable puzzle game.

References

External links

1999 video games
Neo Geo Pocket Color games
Puzzle video games
Bubble Bobble
Ukiyotei games
Video games developed in Japan
Video games scored by Yasuaki Fujita